The Feroz Award for Best Supporting Actor (Spanish: Premio Feroz al mejor actor de reparto) is one of the annual awards given at the Feroz Awards, presented by the Asociación de Informadores Cinematográficos de España. It was first presented in 2014.

Winners and nominees

2010s

2020s

See also
 Goya Award for Best Supporting Actor
 Goya Award for Best New Actor

References

External links
 Official website

Feroz Awards
2014 establishments in Spain
Awards established in 2014
Film awards for supporting actor